Matthieu Bailet (born 23 April 1996) is a French World Cup alpine ski racer from Nice, France. He specializes in the speed events of downhill and super-G.

Bailet made his World Cup debut in March 2016 at St. Moritz, Switzerland, following his gold medal at the Junior World Championships. His first podium was five years later, as the runner-up in a super-G at Saalbach-Hinterglemm, Austria.

World Cup results

Season standings

Race podiums
 1 podium – (1 SG); 7 top tens

World Championship results

References

External links

French Ski Team – 2021 men's A team 

French male alpine skiers
1996 births
Living people
Sportspeople from Nice
Alpine skiers at the 2022 Winter Olympics
Olympic alpine skiers of France
21st-century French people